

439001–439100 

|-bgcolor=#f2f2f2
| colspan=4 align=center | 
|}

439101–439200 

|-bgcolor=#f2f2f2
| colspan=4 align=center | 
|}

439201–439300 

|-bgcolor=#f2f2f2
| colspan=4 align=center | 
|}

439301–439400 

|-bgcolor=#f2f2f2
| colspan=4 align=center | 
|}

439401–439500 

|-bgcolor=#f2f2f2
| colspan=4 align=center | 
|}

439501–439600 

|-bgcolor=#f2f2f2
| colspan=4 align=center | 
|}

439601–439700 

|-bgcolor=#f2f2f2
| colspan=4 align=center | 
|}

439701–439800 

|-id=718
| 439718 Danielcervantes ||  || Daniel Cervantes (born 1973) is an engineer who specializes in guidance and control systems for NASA spacecraft. || 
|}

439801–439900 

|-bgcolor=#f2f2f2
| colspan=4 align=center | 
|}

439901–440000 

|-bgcolor=#f2f2f2
| colspan=4 align=center | 
|}

References 

439001-440000